The Austin Sessions is the name of two albums:

The Austin Sessions (Edwin McCain album)
The Austin Sessions (Kris Kristofferson album)
The Austin Sessions (Caedmon's Call EP)